Avram Iancu Cluj International Airport  is an airport serving the city of Cluj-Napoca, Romania. The airport is named in honour of Romanian revolutionary Avram Iancu.

In terms of passenger traffic, Cluj Airport is the second busiest airport in Romania, after Bucharest Henri Coandă, handling 2.9 million passengers in 2019. Its size and location (on the European route E576 and close to A3 Transylvania Motorway) make it the most important airport in the historical region of Transylvania.

History

On 15 December 1917, the County Council of Kolozsvár (today Cluj-Napoca) gave land in the settlement of Szamosfalva (today the Someșeni district of Cluj-Napoca) in order to develop a military airport. The first passenger plane landed on 2 August 1928. The Cluj Airport was founded on 1 April 1932 by the Romanian Ministry of Industry and Trade. Until the civil airport was built, the first operations used the Someșeni Military Aerodrome that was founded by the Romanian National Service of Air Navigation in 1928. The SNNA was set up by the Romanian Ministry of War for opening an air transportation line between Cluj and Bucharest. The first aircraft used was the Farman-Goliath aircraft, a twin-engine plane with space for ten passengers built by the Farman Aviation Works.

In 1933, Cluj Airport was declared an International Airport by the Romanian Government. The first international flight, a CSA Czech Airlines Prague-Cluj-Bucharest flight, took place on 11 September 1933. The aircraft used on this route were eight-seat Avia-Fokker aircraft. In the following years, several new routes were opened, such as the Aeroflot Moscow-Cluj-Prague flight, opened on 15 November 1935, which was operated with 14-seat McDonnell Douglas DC-2 twin-engine aircraft, registered as USSR-M25 and USSR-M26. Internal flights were also operated in this period, such as Cluj-Satu-Mare and Cernăuţi-Cluj-Arad using Lockheed Model 10 Electra ten-passenger aircraft and de Havilland Dragon Rapide aircraft. In the late 1930s, the airport recorded steady growth and the employees' number rose from 6 in 1934 to 16 in 1939. The passenger terminal was also built in this period, being inaugurated in 1939.

During World War II, the airport became again a military airport, as it was considered to be the most important in Transylvania. In 1940, as a result of the Second Vienna Award, Northern Transylvania (including Cluj) was ceded to Hungary and thus the airport was used by the Hungarian Air Force and German Luftwaffe. Malert airline also operated flights to Budapest during these years. In October 1944, the Hungarian forces in the city were defeated by the Romanian and Soviet armies. By the time of the reconquest of the airport by the Romanian No. 4 Fighting Squadron Focşani, in late September 1944, the airport was completely destroyed.

After the war, the airport's operations were resumed with TAROM internal flights connecting Cluj to other major Romanian cities. The aircraft used were the Lisunov Li-2 / Douglas DC-3 and Ilyushin Il-14 aircraft.

In the 1960s, an extensive modernization of the airport began. In 1969, a new passenger terminal was opened. By 1970, the airport was fully equipped with all of the safety facilities.

The airport remained a domestic airport until September 1996, when it was once again opened to both international passenger and cargo traffic. The extension of the terminal building was also started in 1996 and since August 1997, it is run by the Cluj County Council. By 2001, the extension of the airport building was finished, the runway lighting system was modernized, and an Instrument Landing System (ILS) CAT I equipment was implemented.

In 2007 and 2008, the airport posted year-over-year growth of 60% and 93% respectively, reaching over 750,000 passengers in 2008.

The construction of a new terminal, capable of handling 2 million passengers annually, started on 26 June 2007. The connecting building between the two terminals was inaugurated in November 2009. The total project cost was an estimated €40 million. In February 2009, the ILS equipment was upgraded to CAT II.

Cluj Airport exceeded the 1,000,000 passenger mark in 2010. On 8 September 2011, the construction works for building a new runway of  began. The new runway 07/25 officially went into operation on 26 October 2013. The old runway 08/26 became a taxiway, after the new runway opened.

In 2014, ROMATSA held a competition for the creation of a new control tower for Cluj-Napoca Airport. Of the 22 projects that were submitted in the competition,  as winner the project of Outline Architecture Office was chosen, an architectural design office based in Bucharest. The tower resembles a tulnic and will have a height of 42 m. The costs for the construction of the new control tower will be borne by ROMATSA.

Airlines and destinations
The following airlines operate regular scheduled and charter flights to and from Cluj-Napoca:

Statistics

Ground transportation

The drive from the city centre takes about 20 minutes. CTP Cluj Napoca, the local public transport company, operates its Route No. 8 that connects the airport with the Mihai Viteazul Square in the City Center and trolleybus No. 5 to the Main Rail Station.

Accidents and incidents
 On 5 September 1986 at about 19:45, a fully loaded Antonov An-24RV aircraft departed Bucharest Otopeni Airport, bound for Cluj-Napoca. When the landing procedure began, one of the flight attendants, Aurelia Grigore, realized that the aircraft was landing at higher than normal speed. When the main landing gear touched the ground, it bounced repeatedly until the aircraft stopped. The front of the aircraft was on fire. Grigore realized they had an emergency situation. With her flight attendant colleague, she decided to start deplaning passengers. She opened the emergency exit and she let the stairs down, but the stairs weren't touching the ground because the front gear was broken. She was helped by Emil Hossu, a famous actor. "He was one of the few people that didn't panic and helped us evacuate the aircraft in safety", said Grigore. After evacuating the passengers they returned to help the pilots who were trapped in the cockpit. "The cockpit was on fire and we lost any faith that we could save them". The next moments were horrible for all passengers and flight crew. The aircraft was destroyed by flames and with the pilots still on board. After 10 minutes, they saw one of the copilots trying to escape through a window. "He told us his foot was stuck and that he couldn't get it out. We tried to help him, but we couldn't. Finally, he managed to get out of the aircraft on fire. He was completely burned, you couldn't even look at him. It was terrible. The other 2 pilots burned alive as we watched them, helpless". The copilot died also. He was transported to the ER but died the next day because of the burns. The authorities said that the accident was due to an equipment malfunction. The 3 pilots were the only casualties.
 On 7 January 2016, a Blue Air Boeing 737-400, reg. YR-BAS, skidded off the runway after landing. No injuries were reported amongst the 116 passengers and crew. The accident's cause was the performance of an extended flare flight, followed by the runway touchdown at a distance of about 2300 ft. (approx. 700 m) measured from runway threshold 25. The wet snow layer present on the runway may have contributed to the accident.

See also
Aviation in Romania
List of airports in Romania
List of the busiest airports in Romania
Transport in Romania

References

External links

 Official website
 Google Maps - aerial view
 

Buildings and structures in Cluj-Napoca
Airports in Romania
Airports established in 1932
1932 establishments in Romania
Cluj-Napoca